James Rodger Fleming, is a historian of science and technology, and the Charles A. Dana Professor of Science, Technology, and Society at Colby College, and author of the book Fixing the Sky: The Checkered History of Weather and Climate Control.

Life and career
Fleming is a Fellow of the American Association for the Advancement of Science (AAAS), and a fellow of the American Meteorological Society (AMS). He is regarded as an expert for climate engineering, and critical of technological fixes to address global warming.

Awards and honors
Charles A. Lindbergh Chair in Aerospace History and the AAAS Roger Revelle Fellowship in Global Stewardship during his time as a public policy scholar at the Woodrow Wilson International Center for Scholars.

Bibliography
Sourced per his homepage at Colby College.
Meteorology in America, 1800-1870 (Johns Hopkins, 1990)
Historical Perspectives on Climate Change (Oxford, 1998)
The Callendar Effect (AMS, 2007)
Fixing the Sky (Columbia, 2010)
Inventing Atmospheric Science (MIT, 2016)
FIRST WOMAN: Joanne Simpson and the Tropical Atmosphere (Oxford, 2020)

Publications
The Climate Engineers (2007)
Fixing the Sky: The Checkered History of Climate Engineering (2012)
Meteorology: Weather makers (2017)

References

External links
Fixing the Sky: The Checkered History of Weather and Climate Control
Biographical Sketch, https://pabook.libraries.psu.edu/literary-cultural-heritage-map-pa/bios/Fleming__James_Rodger

Place of birth missing (living people)
Date of birth missing (living people)
1949 births
Living people
American Association for the Advancement of Science
Intergovernmental Panel on Climate Change contributing authors
21st-century American historians
American male non-fiction writers
Fellows of the American Meteorological Society
Colby College faculty